Perakanthus is a monotypic genus of flowering plants in the family Rubiaceae. The sole species is Perakanthus velutinus, which is endemic to Peninsular Malaysia.

References

Monotypic Rubiaceae genera
Vanguerieae
Endemic flora of Peninsular Malaysia